Norway competed in the Eurovision Song Contest 2003, represented by Jostein Hasselgård with the song "I'm Not Afraid to Move On". The song was chosen as the Norwegian entry for the 2003 contest through the Melodi Grand Prix contest.

Before Eurovision

Melodi Grand Prix 2003 
Melodi Grand Prix 2003 was the Norwegian national final that selected Norway's entry for the Eurovision Song Contest 2003.

Competing entries 
A submission period was opened by NRK where songwriters of any nationality were allowed to submit entries for the first time. More than 450 submissions were received by NRK. Twelve songs were selected for the competition by a jury panel.

Final 
The final took place on 1 March 2003 at the Oslo Spektrum in Oslo, hosted by Øystein Bache. The winner was selected over two rounds of regional televoting. In the first round, the top four entries were selected to proceed to the second round, the Gold Final. The results of the public televote were revealed by Norway's five regions, with the televoting figures of each region being converted to points. The top ten songs received 1–8, 10 and 12 points. In the Gold Final, the results of the public televote, based on actual voting figures of each region, were revealed by Norway's five regions and led to the victory of "I'm Not Afraid to Move On" performed by Jostein Hasselgård with 78,460 votes.

At Eurovision
After being relegated from competing at the Eurovision Song Contest 2002 Norway returned to the contest in 2003, at Riga. Jostein Hasselgård performed 18th on the night of the contest, following Greece and preceding France. After leading at the start of the voting Norway finished with 123 points, coming 4th of the 26 competing countries. This guaranteed Norway automatic qualification to the final of the 2004 Contest.

Voting

References

External links
Norwegian National Final 2003

2003
Countries in the Eurovision Song Contest 2003
2003
Eurovision
Eurovision